2126 Gerasimovich, provisional designation , is a stony background asteroid from the inner regions of the asteroid belt, approximately 8 kilometers in diameter. It was discovered on 30 August 1970, by Soviet astronomer Tamara Smirnova at the Crimean Astrophysical Observatory in Nauchnyj, on the Crimean peninsula. The asteroid was named after Russian astronomer Boris Gerasimovich.

Orbit and classification 

Gerasimovich is a non-family asteroid from the main belt's background population. It orbits the Sun in the inner asteroid belt at a distance of 2.1–2.7 AU once every 3 years and 8 months (1,349 days; semi-major axis of 2.39 AU). Its orbit has an eccentricity of 0.12 and an inclination of 8° with respect to the ecliptic.

Physical characteristics 

Gerasimovich is an assumed, stony S-type asteroid.

Rotation period 

In October 2007, a rotational lightcurve of Gerasimovich was obtained from photometric observations by Maurice Clark at Montgomery College Observatory. Lightcurve analysis gave a rotation period of 22.951 hours with a brightness amplitude of 0.12 magnitude.

Diameter and albedo 

According to the surveys carried out by the Japanese Akari satellite and the NEOWISE mission of NASA's Wide-field Infrared Survey Explorer, Gerasimovich measures between 7.11 and 9.46 kilometers in diameter and its surface has an albedo between 0.12 and 0.318.

The Collaborative Asteroid Lightcurve Link assumes a standard albedo for stony asteroids of 0.20 and calculates a diameter of 8.57 kilometers based on an absolute magnitude of 12.7.

Naming 

This minor planet was named after Russian astronomer Boris Gerasimovich (1889–1937), professor at the National University of Kharkiv and director of the Pulkovo Observatory near Saint Petersburg, Russia. He is also honored by a lunar crater Gerasimovich. The official naming citation was published by the Minor Planet Center on 1 June 1980.

References

External links 
 (2126) Gerasimovich at AstDyS-2
 Asteroid Lightcurve Database (LCDB), query form (info )
 Dictionary of Minor Planet Names, Google books
 Asteroids and comets rotation curves, CdR – Observatoire de Genève, Raoul Behrend
 Discovery Circumstances: Numbered Minor Planets (1)-(5000) – Minor Planet Center
 
 

002126
Discoveries by Tamara Mikhaylovna Smirnova
Named minor planets
19700830